Governor Patterson or Paterson may refer to:

 David Paterson (born 1954), Governor of New York from 2008 to 2010
 I. L. Patterson (1859–1929), Governor of Oregon from 1927 to 1929
 John Malcolm Patterson (1921–2021), Governor of Alabama from 1959 to 1963
 Malcolm R. Patterson (1861–1935), Governor of Tennessee from 1907 to 1911
 Paul L. Patterson (1900–1956), Governor of Oregon from 1952 to 1956
 Walter Patterson (governor) (died 1798), British colonial Governor of Prince Edward Island from 1769 to 1786
 William Paterson (judge) (1745–1806), 2nd Governor of New Jersey from 1790 to 1793

See also
Governor Pattison (disambiguation)
 Okey Patteson (1898–1989), 23rd Governor of West Virginia